Hypericum lacei is a shrub in Hypericum sect. Ascyreia, in the St. John's Wort genus.

Description
The species has orange stems, uncommon in Hypericum species, that are 4-lined and become terete as the species matures. The leaves are petiolate and oblong and are a dark shade when dry. The inflorescence is 1-6 flowered from just one node and is deciduous.

Distribution
The species has only been recorded in Myanmar, in Southeast Asia.

References

lacei